Chybice  is a village in the administrative district of Gmina Pawłów, within Starachowice County, Świętokrzyskie Voivodeship, in south-central Poland.

The village has a population of 430.

References

Chybice